Claudia Pinna (born 4 December 1977) is an Italian female long-distance runner, who won two medals at international senior level with the Italian team.

Biography
She won three national championships at individual senior level.

Achievements

National titles
 Italian Athletics Championships
 5000 metres: 2007
 10,000 metres: 2015
 Half marathon: 2013

See also
 Italian team at the running events

References

External links
 

1977 births
Living people
Italian female long-distance runners